Laixi is a county-level city of Qingdao sub-provincial city, Shandong Province, China.

Laixi is known as "Qingdao's Back Garden". , its neighbor to the north; however, Laixi is now the northernmost county-level division of Qingdao and Laiyang is the southernmost division of Yantai.

In mid-2015, The Qing-Long Highway opened, connecting Qingdao and Longkou. This made travel to Qingdao proper (the beach and business area) a faster and safer journey, as State Route 204 between Laixi and Qingdao (proper) is often crowded with trucks, hampered by numerous traffic lights, and narrow lanes. The new highway is not only faster, it's a safer and more enjoyable way to get to Qingdao, and Laixi residents love going to Qingdao

Administrative divisions
As 2012, this city is divided to 6 subdistricts and 11 towns.
Subdistricts

Towns

Transportation
The city is served by Laixi railway station on high-speed lines. Laixi South railway station sees infrequent service from conventional trains on the Lancun–Yantai railway.

Tourism 
Things to do in Laixi:

Laixi is known for its slower way of life. Residents enjoy fishing at Laixi Lake, which is actually a reservoir, or in town at Moon Lake Park. Western conveniences are few in 2015, but compared to a few years ago, the scene has changed rapidly. Laixi now boasts several small coffee shops (Sky Coffee and Yorktown), and a few places to get pizza (Oh My Pizza, Toby Pizza and Terrace Restaurant). If you come to Laixi in the winter, you should probably know someone, because they roll up the streets quite early, and there are few options for meeting in public - there is however a McDonald's and (as of 2014) two KFC's. These, however, are not pleasant late night meeting places as they would be in other bigger cities around China - just an option for a bite to eat. Perhaps as other smaller towns in China, Laixi is a good place to enjoy the Spring Festival, but again, you'd better know someone there - families have very clear rituals, and time schedules. The amazing thing about Spring Festival in Laixi is that you will see rituals no longer practiced in the big cities. In fact many will leave the big cities to "come home" for the holidays if they still have family in Laixi. Traditions such as watching the CCTV Gala on New Year's night, going to "this" family member's house on the first day of the new year, and "that" family member's house on the second day.  The third day is reserved for married daughters to come home, with their husband and kids of course.

Climate

References

Cities in Shandong
County-level divisions of Shandong
Geography of Qingdao